Dean Hanson is an English former professional rugby league footballer who played in the 1980s and 1990s. He played for Illawarra in the NSWRL competition and for Halifax in England.

Background
Hanson's uncle Gary Stephens is a former rugby league player who won the 1976 NSWRL premiership with Manly. His cousin Gareth Stephens is also a former rugby league player.

Playing career
Hanson started his career in England with Halifax during the 1987 season. Hanson then moved to Australia and signed with Illawarra where he played 61 games over the next five years. Hanson's time at Illawarra wasn't particular successful with the club finishing last in 1989 and failing to make the finals in all the other seasons he played there.

References

Illawarra Steelers players
English rugby league players
Halifax R.L.F.C. players
Rugby league locks
Rugby league second-rows
1964 births
Living people